Selmer Bringsjord (born November 24, 1958) is the chair of the Department of Cognitive Science at Rensselaer Polytechnic Institute and a professor of Computer Science and Cognitive Science. He also holds an appointment in the Lally School of Management & Technology and teaches artificial Intelligence (AI), formal logic, human and machine reasoning, and philosophy of AI.

Bringsjord's education includes a B.A. in Philosophy from the University of Pennsylvania and a Ph.D. in Philosophy from Brown University. He conducts research in AI as the director of the Rensselaer AI & Reasoning Laboratory (RAIR). He specializes in the logico-mathematical and philosophical foundations of AI and cognitive science, and in collaboratively building AI systems on the basis of computational logic.

Bringsjord believes that "the human mind will forever be superior to AI", and that "much of what many humans do for a living will be better done by indefatigable machines who require not a cent in pay". Bringsjord has stated that the "ultimate growth industry will be building smarter and smarter such machines on the one hand, and philosophizing about whether they are truly conscious and free on the other".

Bringsjord has an argument for P = NP using digital physics. Other research includes developing a new computational-logic framework allowing the formalization of deliberative multi-agent "mindreading" as applied to the realm of nuclear strategy, with the goal of creating a model and simulation to enable reliable prediction. He has published an opinion piece advocating for counter-terrorism security ensured by pervasive, all-seeing sensors; automated reasoners; and autonomous, lethal robots.

Prof. Selmer Bringsjord received a National Science Foundation award to research Social Robotics and the Covey Award for the advancement of philosophy of computing awarded by the International Association for Computing And Philosophy, among several others prizes.

Books authored
with Yang, Y. Mental Metalogic: A New, Unifying Theory of Human and Machine Reasoning (Mahwah, NJ: Lawrence Erlbaum).(2007)
with Zenzen, M.  Superminds: People Harness Hypercomputation, and More (Dordrecht, The Netherlands: Kluwer). (2003)
with Ferrucci, D. Artificial Intelligence and Literary Creativity: Inside the Mind of Brutus, A Storytelling Machine (Mahwah, NJ: Lawrence Erlbaum).(2000)
Abortion: A Dialogue (Indianapolis, IN: Hackett).(1997)
What Robots Can and Can’t Be (Dordrecht, The Netherlands: Kluwer).(1992)
Soft Wars (New York, NY: Penguin USA). A novel.(1991)

Footnotes

External links
Department of Cognitive Science at Rensselaer Polytechnic Institute
Rensselaer AI & Reasoning Lab
Selmer Bringsjord Personal web site at Rensselaer Polytechnic Institute

1958 births
Living people
American computer scientists
Artificial intelligence researchers
Human–computer interaction researchers
American technology writers
Machine learning researchers
Rensselaer Polytechnic Institute faculty
University of Pennsylvania alumni
Brown University alumni